The Save the Children Fund, commonly known as Save the Children, is an international, non-government operated organization. It was founded in the UK in 1919, with the goal of helping improve the lives of children worldwide.

The organization helps to raise money to improve children's lives by creating better educational opportunities, better health care, and improved economic opportunities.

The organization has general consultative status in the United Nations Economic and Social Council.

Origins 
The Save the Children Fund was founded in London, England, on 15 April 1919 by Eglantyne Jebb and her sister Dorothy Buxton as an effort to alleviate starvation of children in Germany and Austria-Hungary during the Allied blockade of Germany of World War I which continued after the Armistice.

At the end of World War I, images of malnourished and sick children ran throughout Europe. The Fight the Famine Council was initially started earlier in 1919 to put political pressure on the British government to end the blockade, the first meeting having been held at the home of Catherine Courtney, at 15 Cheyne Walk. However, on 15 April 1919, the sisters succeeded in separating the effort from the politics of the council and creating a separate "Save the Children Fund".

In May 1919, the Fund was publicly established at a meeting in London's Royal Albert Hall to "provide relief to children suffering the effects of war" and raise money for emergency aid to children suffering from the wartime shortages of food and supplies.

Jebb and her sister worked to gain public sympathy to elicit support aid. In December 1919, Pope Benedict XV publicly announced his support for Save the Children, and declared 28 December 'Innocents Day' to collect donations.

The first branch was opened in Fife, Scotland in 1919. A counterpart, Rädda Barnen (which means "Save the Children"), was founded later that year (on 19 November 1919) in Sweden with Anna Kleman on the board. Along with a number of other organisations, they founded the International Save the Children Union in Geneva on 6 January 1920. Jebb built up excellent relationships with other Geneva-based organisations, including the Red Cross who supported Save's International foundation.

Jebb used many ground-breaking fund-raising techniques, for example making Save the Children the first charity in the United Kingdom to use page-length advertisements in newspapers. Jebb contracted doctors, lawyers and other professionals to devise mass advertisement campaigns. In 1920, Save the Children started individual child sponsorship as a way to engage more donors. By the end of the year, Save the Children raised the equivalent to about £8,000,000 in today's money.

Russian famine 
By August 1921, the UK Save the Children had raised over £1,000,000, and conditions for children in Central Europe were improving due to their efforts. However, the Russian famine of 1921 made Jebb realise that Save the Children must be a permanent organisation and that children's rights constantly need to be protected. Their mission was thus changed to "an international effort to preserve child life wherever it is menaced by conditions of economic hardship and distress".

From 1921 to 1923, Save the Children created press campaigns, propaganda movies, feeding centers in Russia and in Turkey to accommodate and educate thousands of refugees. They began to work with several other organisations such as the Russian Famine Relief Fund and Nansen which resulted in recognition by the League of Nations. Although Russia was largely closed off to international relief and aid, Save the Children persuaded Soviet authorities to let them have a ground presence.

At home, the Daily Express criticised the Fund's work, denying the severity of the situation and arguing they should be helping their own people before helping Russia. The charity responded with increased publicity about the famine, showing images of starving children and mass graves. The campaign gained national appeal, eventually allowing the organisation to charter the SS Torcello to Russia with 600 tons of relief supplies. Over 157 million rations were given out, saving nearly 300,000 children. Improved conditions meant Save the Children's Russian feeding program was able to be closed in the summer of 1923, after having won international acclaim.

Second World War 
Save the Children staff were among the first into the liberated areas after World War II, working with refugee children and displaced persons in former occupied Europe, including Nazi concentration camps survivors. During this same time, work in the United Kingdom focused on improving conditions for children growing up in cities devastated by bombing and facing huge disruptions in family life.

Continuing crises 
The 1950s saw a continuation of this type of crisis-driven work, with additional demands for help following the Korean War and the 1956 Hungarian Revolution, and the opening of new work in Africa, Asia and the Middle East in response to the decline of the British empire.

Like other aid agencies, Save the Children was active in the major disasters of the era—especially the Vietnam War and the Biafra secession in Nigeria. The latter brought shocking images of child starvation onto the television screens of the West for the first time in a major way. The sort of mass-marketing campaigns first used by Save the Children in the 1920s was repeated, with great success in fundraising.

Disasters in Ethiopia, Sudan, and many other world hotspots led to appeals which brought public donations on a huge scale, and a consequent expansion of the organisation's work. However, the children's rights-based approach to development originated by Jebb continues to be an important factor. It was used in a major campaign in the late 1990s against the use of child soldiers in Africa.

During the 2014 Ebola outbreak in Sierra Leone, new cases outnumbered the available hospital beds in the country. Save the Children worked with the UK government's Department for International Development and Ministry of Defence to build and run a 100-bed treatment centre in Sierra Leone, as well as support an Interim Care Center in Kailahun for children who had lost their families to Ebola.

Contribution to UN Declaration of the Rights of the Child 
In 1923, Save the Children founder Jebb voiced her support for an international declaration that establishes universal rights for children by remarking that "I believe we should claim certain rights for the children and labour for their universal recognition, so that everybody—not merely the small number of people who are in a position to contribute to relief funds, but everybody who in any way comes into contact with children, that is to say the vast majority of mankind—may be in a position to help forward the movement."

Jebb created an initial draft for what would become the UN Declaration of the Rights of the Child in 1923. It contained the following five criteria:

 The child must be given the means requisite for its normal development, both materially and spiritually.
 The child that is hungry must be fed, the child that is sick must be nursed, the child that is backward must be helped, the delinquent child must be reclaimed, and the orphan and the waif must be sheltered and succored.
 The child must be the first to receive relief in times of distress.
 The child must not be put in a position to earn a livelihood and must be protected against every form of exploitation.
 The child must be brought up in the consciousness that its talents must be devoted to the service of its fellow men.

The League of Nations adopted these five points as Declaration of Geneva in 1924. This was the first important assertion of the rights of children as separate from adults and began the process that would lead to the UN Convention on the Rights of the Child, adopted by the United Nations in 1989.

Convention on the Rights of the Child 
Following the atrocities of World War II, the United Nations adopted the Universal Declaration of Human Rights in 1948. However, many individuals felt the rights of children needed to be addressed in further detail with a separate document.

The Convention consists of 54 articles that address the basic human rights to which all children are entitled: the right to survival; development to the fullest; protection from harmful influences, abuse and exploitation; and full participation in family, cultural and social life. The four core principles of the convention are non-discrimination; devotion to the best interests of the child; the right to life, survival, and development; and respect for the views of the child.

Today, the Convention serves as the basis for all of Save the Children's work. It has been ratified in every country and around the world, with the exception of the United States.

Structure and Accountability 
Save the Children is an international umbrella organisation, with 30 national member organisations serving over 120 countries. Members lead on activities within their home territory and work with donors to develop programmes abroad, which are coordinated and delivered by a central body – Save the Children International – via teams on the ground in each country. Save the Children International also oversees humanitarian responses.

All members of the association are bound by the International Save the Children Alliance Bylaws which includes The Child Protection Protocol and Code of Conduct. These set a standard for common values, principles, and beliefs.

The Save the Children International website states that the member organisations work towards achieving four key initiatives:

 Secure quality education for 8 million children affected by armed conflict.
 Expand and improve their presence in countries of strategic importance.
 Create a stronger voice for children where more than one member has programmes by integrating country operations.
 Become the emergency response agency for children worldwide by improving disaster preparedness and response capacity so that they can best deliver immediate and lasting improvements to children.

Connections with other organisations 
Save the Children helps to fund, and is aided with funds raised by, the British will-making scheme Will Aid, in which participating solicitors waive their usual fee to write a basic will and in exchange invite the client to donate to charity. Save the Children collaborates with other NGOs in Family Tracing and Reunification.

Collaboration with banks 
Save the Children teamed up with Barclays and Standard Chartered in 2021 to create Fintech for International Development (F4ID), a social enterprise that "uses digital solutions to help deliver rising amounts of humanitarian assistance to hard-to-reach communities, ensuring it reaches those most in need".

Controversies

The Save the Children Fund film 

In 1969, Save the Children UK commissioned film director Ken Loach and producer Tony Garnett to make The Save the Children Fund Film. The resulting film was unacceptable to the organisation because they felt it presented their work in an unfavourable light. Eventually a legal agreement was arrived at which involved the material being deposited in the National Film Archive. In 2011, roughly 42 years later, it was shown to the public for the first time.

Expulsion from Pakistan 

In July 2011, the Guardian uncovered a fake vaccination program by the CIA. It then emerged that Dr. Shakil Afridi, the person organising the CIA's "vaccinations", had claimed that he was a Save the Children employee. In May 2012, Save the Children's country director for Pakistan, David Wright, revealed that the organisation's work had been badly disrupted ever since Afridi had made his claim, with medicines held up for long periods at airports, staff unable to get visas, and so forth. Wright also charged that the CIA had breached international humanitarian law and risked the safety of aid groups worldwide. "It was a setback, no doubt," said Dr. Elias Durry, the World Health Organization's polio coordinator for Pakistan, a few months later. Later that year, in September, it was reported that the Pakistani government had requested Save the Children's foreign staff to leave the country, In January 2013, the Deans of twelve top US schools of public health sent a letter to President Obama protesting against the entanglement of intelligence operations in public health campaigns. The letter describes the negative and lasting impacts of the Central Intelligence Agency's (CIA) use of a fake vaccination campaign in Pakistan during the hunt for Osama bin Laden in 2011, which exacerbated the already persistent public mistrust of vaccines in the country.

The CIA's "vaccination program" sparked a series of deadly attacks in Pakistan against dozens of aid and health workers associated with various aid and health campaigns, with the UN-backed polio-vaccination drive repeatedly halted as a result. Up to eight polio vaccination workers were assassinated in the country during this backlash. In May 2014, the Obama administration announced that they would no longer use vaccination programs as a cover for CIA activities.

Pakistani investigators said in a July 2012 report that Shakil Afridi met 25 times with "foreign secret agents, received instructions and provided sensitive information to them." According to an early draft of a Pakistan Government report, which has not been publicly released, Afridi told investigators that the charity Save the Children helped facilitate his meeting with US intelligence agents although the charity denies the charge. The report alleges that Save the Children's Pakistan director at the time of the incident introduced Afridi to a western woman in Islamabad and that Afridi and the woman met regularly afterwards.

The claim that the Save the Children Country Director had introduced Afridi to the woman is not credible, as the Country Director concerned had left Pakistan permanently well before the alleged meeting took place. The allegation does not appear in subsequent drafts of the report, although the document has still not been publicly released. 

On 11 June 2015, Pakistani authorities ordered all Save the Children workers to leave Pakistan within 15 days, and the organisation's office in Islamabad was closed and padlocked. This saga has led to a high degree of distrust and scepticism against the validity of COVID-19 vaccines in Pakistan.

Complaints of inappropriate behaviour 
Chief strategist of Save the Children UK Brendan Cox resigned in September 2015 over allegations of "inappropriate behaviour". The charity, and Oxfam, temporarily suspended bids for government funds due to the scandal. Cox had previously denied any wrongdoing but finally admitted to inappropriate behaviour on 18 February 2018 and quit working for his two other charities.

On 5 March 2020, the Charity Commission published an investigation report that found there had been serious weaknesses in Save the Children's workplace culture, following a probe into the charity's response to allegations of misconduct and harassment against staff between 2012 and 2015. There were five complaints of sexual harassment and thirteen of bullying between 2016 and June 2018. Save the Children UK chief executive Justin Forsyth had three complaints of misconduct directed towards him by female staff, while Brendan Cox was publicly accused of sexual assault. The charity trustees had not been sent copies of an external report on corporate culture. Since then the charity has strengthened reporting and whistle-blowing policies that now permit anonymous staff complaints.

On 22 February 2018 Forsyth resigned from UNICEF to avoid "damage" to the charities.

On 11 September 2020, it was announced the charity could resume bids for government funding.

Logo font by Eric Gill 
On 15 January 2022, it was announced that Save the Children would change the typeface in its logo, Gill Sans, due to its authorship in the 1920s by British artist Eric Gill, who was posthumously revealed to have documented the sexual abuse of his young daughters, an incestuous relationship with his sister and sexual experiments with his dog. An anonymous source told The Times that the organization had been previously warned of the typeface's origin before its adoption, and that the decision to change it was made one year prior. The new logo is expected to be revealed later into 2022.

Jalalabad terror attack 

On 14 January 2010, militants affiliated with Islamic State of Iraq and the Levant – Khorasan Province launched a bomb and gun attack on a Save the Children office in Jalalabad, a city in the eastern Afghan province of Nangarhar, killing six people and injuring 17.

Archives 
Archives of Save the Children are held at the Cadbury Research Library, University of Birmingham.

See also 
 Children's interests (rhetoric)
 Child Development Index
 Save the Children International
 Save the Children Australia
 Save the Children USA
 Save the Children State of the World's Mothers report
 Street Kids International
 International Save the Children Union
 UNICEF
 NetHope
 Christmas Jumper Day
 Odisha State Child Protection Society
 Children in emergencies and conflicts
 Gopali Youth Welfare Society
 Refugee children

References

Further reading 
 Lynda Mahood, Vic Satzewich, "The Save the Children Fund and the Russian Famine of 1921–23: Claims and Counter-Claims about Feeding 'Bolshevik' Children," Journal of Historical Sociology, 22,1 (2009), 55–83.
 Clare Mulley, "The Woman Who Saved the Children: A biography of Eglantyne Jebb, Founder of Save the Children" (Oneworld Publications, 2009) 
 Rory O'Keeffe

External links 
 

 
Organizations established in 1919
1919 establishments in England
International charities